Working Tra$h is a 1990 American made-for-television comedy film directed by Alan Metter and starring George Carlin, Ben Stiller, Buddy Ebsen, Leslie Hope, and Michael J. Pollard. It was one of the first television films made for the then-burgeoning Fox Network.

Cast
 George Carlin as Ralph (referred to as "Ralph Sawatzky" in a scene at the end of the film, though the surname is not shown in the credits)
 Ben Stiller as Freddy Novak
 Buddy Ebsen as Vandevere Lodge
 Leslie Hope as Susan Fahnestock
 Michael J. Pollard as Palomar
 Jack Blessing as R. Judson Kimbrough
 Dan Castellaneta as George Agrande
 Ellen Ratner as Ruthie
 George Wallace as Big Dan
 Mindy Sterling as Mary
 Lisa Montgomery as Vi
 Michael Gregory as Real Cop
 Gregg Almquist as Herb
 Julian Christopher as Moneyline Reporter
 Newell Alexander as News Reporter

External links

1990 television films
1990 films
American comedy television films
1990 comedy films
Fox network original films
1990s English-language films
20th Century Fox films
Films directed by Alan Metter
1990s American films